María Jesús Rosa Durán (born November 11, 1979 in Madrid) also known as Chus Rosa, is a field hockey goalkeeper from Spain, who represented her native country in two Summer Olympic Games (2004 in Athens, Greece and 2008 in Beijing, China). Rosa grew up and developed her skills in Colegio Valdeluz, a strong quarry of field hockey players in Madrid such as Ignacio Cobos and Rodrigo Garza among others. Rosa was a key member of the Spanish national team that finished fourth at the 2006 Women's Hockey World Cup in Madrid. She was named in the FIH ALL STAR in 2006,2007 and 2008.

References
 Spanish Olympic Committee

External links
 

1979 births
Living people
Spanish female field hockey players
Female field hockey goalkeepers
Olympic field hockey players of Spain
Field hockey players at the 2004 Summer Olympics
Field hockey players at the 2008 Summer Olympics
Field hockey players from Madrid